SiBEAM Inc., a wholly owned subsidiary of Lattice Semiconductor, is a fabless semiconductor company that provides integrated circuits and system solutions for millimeter-wave (mmWave) wireless communications and sensing. 

SiBEAM was founded to commercialize pioneering millimeter wave wireless technology developed at the labs of University of California, Berkeley. The company was also first to market with wireless gigabit mobile video products. SiBEAM is based in Sunnyvale.

History 
SiBEAM was founded in 2004 by researchers in wireless communications from the University of California, Berkeley. Backed by companies including Panasonic, Samsung, Cisco Systems, and Best Buy.  The company raised over $112 million of venture capital financing from U.S. Venture Partners, New Enterprise Associates, Foundation Capital, and Lux Capital in 2004, 2005, 2006, 2008, and 2010. SiBEAM was noted by several publications as one of the promising startup companies in its industry.

In April, 2011 SiBEAM was acquired by Silicon Image for $25.5 million in cash and Silicon Image stock.

On January 5, 2015 Silicon Image Re-Launched SiBEAM, Inc. as a wholly owned subsidiary to drive market development of millimeter-wave products, technologies and solutions 

On March 15, 2015, Silicon Image was acquired by Lattice Semiconductor in an all-cash acquisition, valued at approximately $606.6 million (or approximately $466.6 million on an enterprise value basis). SiBEAM became a direct wholly owned subsidiary of Lattice Semiconductor on June 1, 2015.

On July 18, 2018 Lattice Semiconductor announced that they "will discontinue its millimeter wave business, which is expected to result in approximately $25 million of primarily non-cash restructuring and impairment charges in the second quarter of 2018, and an annualized reduction in operating expenses of approximately $13 million."

References

Wireless HD coming to homes.  CNN / Fortune, February 18, 2009
SiBeam takes wraps off Wireless HD technology. EETimes, June 27, 2007
Amimon makes headway with high-speed home video networking. Venture Beat, December 9, 2008
SiBEAM Goes 60 GHz.  DailyWireless, June 27, 2007

Electronics companies established in 2004
Private equity portfolio companies
Fabless semiconductor companies
Companies based in Sunnyvale, California
Semiconductor companies of the United States